Henry Kerr Longman (8 March 1881 – 7 October 1958) was an English first-class cricketer active 1901–21 who played for Middlesex, Surrey, Marylebone Cricket Club (MCC) and Cambridge University. He was born in Kensington; died in Woking.

References

1881 births
1958 deaths
English cricketers
Middlesex cricketers
Surrey cricketers
Marylebone Cricket Club cricketers
Cambridge University cricketers
Free Foresters cricketers
H. D. G. Leveson Gower's XI cricketers